The Body Politic was a Canadian monthly magazine, which was published from 1971 to 1987. It was one of Canada's first significant gay publications, and played a prominent role in the development of the LGBT community in Canada.

The Body Politic was a queer, activism-based Canadian monthly magazine that published from 1971 to 1987. It was one of the first significant gay publications in Canada, and played a large role in amplifying the Gay Liberation Movement and creating a space for queer issues and voices to be heard. The Body Politic focused on issues related to Gay and Lesbian sex, Queer culture, and other issues relating to the LGBT community at the time. Although The Body Politic was often criticized for talking about taboo topics such as queer sex and relations, queer media continued to grow. Xtra!, an LGBTQ focused magazine expanded in 1993 by launching its sister editions, Xtra! West, based in Vancouver, and Capital Xtra!, based in Ottawa. All three of these publications remained in print until 2015, when Pink Triangle Press discontinued the print publications of the magazines, however, Daily Xtra continues to publish as an online magazine. The Body Politic was ranked as the 17th most influential magazine in Canadian publishing history by Masthead, and in May 2016 the Canadian actor and playwright Nick Green premiered his historical play, Body Politic. This play discussed the role of the magazine in the early Gay Liberation Movement. In 2017, the play was awarded with the Dora Mavor Moore Award for Outstanding New Play.

History

The magazine was first published on November 1, 1971, by an informal collective, operating out of the home of Glad Day Bookshop owner Jearld Moldenhauer. Many members of the collective had been associated with the underground publication Guerilla, which had been relatively gay-friendly but alienated some of its LGBT contributors when it altered Moldenhauer's article about the We Demand protest of August 28, 1971. At a September meeting of the Toronto Gay Alliance, Moldenhauer first proposed the idea of launching a gay-focused publication. Names considered for the magazine included Mandala and Radical Pervert.

In 1973, the publication ran into difficulty with the Toronto Star, which refused to print an advertisement for the magazine because of its policy of refusing to accept ads relating to sexual activity. While the magazine won an Ontario Press Council ruling that the Star's refusal of the ad had been discriminatory, the Star retaliated by discontinuing The Body Politic's printing contract with its commercial printing subsidiary Newsweb Enterprises.

The magazine's editorial collective also created the Canadian Lesbian and Gay Archives in 1973.

The collective was incorporated as Pink Triangle Press in 1975. In that same year, the magazine ran into minor legal difficulties when an installment of cartoonist Rand Holmes' Harold Hedd strip depicted an act of fellatio.

The Body Politic was twice charged with publishing obscene material, in 1977 for Gerald Hannon's article "Men Loving Boys Loving Men", and in 1982 for "Lust with a Very Proper Stranger", an article on fisting. The 1977 raid sparked international protests, especially to the police's seizure of the magazine's subscriber list—Harvey Milk was one of the organizers of a protest at the Canadian consulate in San Francisco against the action. The magazine was ultimately acquitted in both trials, although materials seized by police in the Hannon trial were not returned to the magazine until 1985.

In 1977 and 1978, the magazine was involved in the production of Gay News and Views, an LGBT magazine series on Toronto cable.

In 1982, Toronto City Councillor Joe Piccininni failed in an attempt to have the magazine barred from the city council's press gallery, following a cover story on the Sisters of Perpetual Indulgence which Piccininni deemed disrespectful to Roman Catholicism. In this era, the magazine also became noted for its coverage of the emergence of HIV and AIDS.

The magazine ceased publication in 1987, following Pink Triangle Press's launch of the tabloid Xtra! in 1984.

Legacy
Xtra! expanded in 1993 to launch sister editions Xtra! West in Vancouver and Capital Xtra! in Ottawa. All three publications remained in print until 2015, when Pink Triangle Press discontinued the print publications, but remain in operation today as the online magazine Daily Xtra.

In 2008, The Body Politic was ranked as the 17th most influential magazine in Canadian publishing history by Masthead, the trade magazine of the Canadian magazine publishing industry.

Body Politic, a historical play by Nick Green about the magazine and its role in the early gay liberation movement, premiered at Buddies in Bad Times in May 2016, and won the Dora Mavor Moore Award for Outstanding New Play in 2017.

Contributors
Writers associated with the magazine included Gerald Hannon, Rick Bébout, Chris Bearchell, Stan Persky, Michael Lynch, Stephen O. Murray, John Greyson, David Rayside, Herbert Spiers, Ian Young, Ed Jackson, Sue Golding, Robin Hardy, Richard Summerbell, Thomas Waugh, John Alan Lee and Gary Kinsman.

References

External links
 Detailed book on the history of The Body Politic (online book)
 the body politic issues on Internet Archive, as uploaded by the Canadian Museum of Human Rights
 The Body Politic fonds - Archival records at The ArQuives: Canada's LGBTQ2+ Archives
 History of "The Body Politic" and the police raid of its headquarters (video)

1971 establishments in Ontario
1987 disestablishments in Ontario
1970s LGBT literature
1980s LGBT literature
Defunct magazines published in Canada
LGBT history in Canada
LGBT culture in Toronto
LGBT-related magazines published in Canada
Magazines established in 1971
Magazines disestablished in 1987
Magazines published in Toronto
Monthly magazines published in Canada